The 2018–19 Illinois State Redbirds women's basketball team represents Illinois State University during the 2018–19 NCAA Division I women's basketball season. The Redbirds, led by first year head coach Kristen Gillespie, play their home games at Redbird Arena and were members of the Missouri Valley Conference. They finished the season 19–12, 11–7 in MVC play to finish in fourth place. They advanced to the semifinals of the Missouri Valley women's tournament where they lost to Drake. Despite having 19 wins, they were not invited to a postseason tournament.

Roster

Schedule

|-
!colspan=9 style=| Exhibition

|-
!colspan=9 style=| Non-conference regular season

|-
!colspan=9 style=| Missouri Valley regular season

|-
!colspan=9 style=| Missouri Valley Women's Tournament

See also
 2018–19 Illinois State Redbirds men's basketball team

References

Illinois State Redbirds women's basketball seasons
Illinois State